In enzymology, a glycine dehydrogenase (cyanide-forming) is an enzyme that catalyzes the chemical reaction

glycine + 2 A  hydrogen cyanide + CO2 + 2 AH2

Thus, the two substrates of this enzyme are glycine and A, whereas its 3 products are hydrogen cyanide, CO2, and AH2.

This enzyme belongs to the family of oxidoreductases, specifically those acting on the CH-NH2 group of donors with other acceptors.  The systematic name of this enzyme class is glycine:acceptor oxidoreductase (hydrogen-cyanide-forming). Other names in common use include hydrogen cyanide synthase, and HCN synthase.

References

 
 
 
 

EC 1.4.99
Enzymes of unknown structure